Katalin Rozsnyói (sometimes shown as Katalin Rozsnyói-Sági, born November 20, 1942) is a Hungarian sprint canoer who competed in the late 1960s. She won a silver medal in the K-2 500 m event at the 1968 Summer Olympics in Mexico City.

As a canoeing coach, Katalin Fábiánné Rozsnyói became one of the best Hungarian coaches. In 2000s she was named the Coach of the Year in Hungary six times in a row by the members of the Hungarian Sports Journalists' Association; this series was broken only in 2007 by the tennis coach Zoltan Kuharszky. Rozsynyoi was awarded the International Olympic Committee Coaches Lifetime achievement award in October 2018.

References

External sources 
Sports-reference.com profile

1942 births
Canoeists at the 1968 Summer Olympics
Hungarian female canoeists
Living people
Olympic canoeists of Hungary
Olympic silver medalists for Hungary
Olympic medalists in canoeing

Medalists at the 1968 Summer Olympics